Rejected is an independently released EP by American singer Ben Jelen. The EP failed to appear on any charts in the U.S. and, apart from the recordings released as part of his appearance on Sessions@AOL, was the only material released by Jelen after his departure from Maverick Records until he signed to Custard Records and released his subsequent album, Ex-Sensitive. The album is still available for download on iTunes.

The song "Baby Girl" features Jelen's brother Sebastian and was written for their sister Nina's funeral when she died in the summer of 2005.

Track listing 
 "Driver"
 "Teenage Suburban Queen"
 "Room 1023"
 "Tell Me Everything"
 "Baby Girl"

2005 EPs
Ben Jelen albums